Midnight Mystery is a 1930 American pre-Code mystery film directed by George B. Seitz, from a screenplay by Beulah Marie Dix, which was adapted from the play Hawk Island by Howard Irving Young. Betty Compson starred, leading an ensemble cast which included Hugh Trevor, Lowell Sherman, Rita La Roy, Ivan Lebedeff, Raymond Hatton, June Clyde and Marcelle Corday.

Plot
Gregory Sloane is a millionaire who lives in an isolated mansion on Hawk Island, off the coast of New England. He invites a disparate group of people to his home, who are soon cut off from the mainland when a fierce storm blows in. While confined, tensions erupt among the guests, leading to the murder of Mischa Kawelin.

One of the other guests, Sally Wayne, an author who writes murder mysteries and Sloane's fiancée, takes it upon herself to solve the crime. Over the course of the evening, she uncovers and strategically puts together all the clues, culminating in her getting the murderer to confess.

Cast
 Betty Compson as Sally Wayne
 Hugh Trevor as Gregory Sloane
 Lowell Sherman as Tom Austen
 Rita La Roy as Madeline Austen
 Ivan Lebedeff as Mischa Kawelin
 Raymond Hatton as Paul Cooper
 Marcelle Corday as Harriet Cooper
 June Clyde as Louise Hollister
 Sidney D'Albrook as Barker

(cast list is per AFI Database)

Notes
The play Hawk Island, from which this film was adapted, played at the Longacre Theatre in 1929, starring Clark Gable in the role of Gregory Sloane.

References

External links

1930 films
1930 mystery films
American mystery films
American black-and-white films
Films directed by George B. Seitz
American films based on plays
1930s American films